Axelsson is a Swedish surname. Notable people with the surname include:

 Andreas Axelsson, Swedish musician
 Andreas Axelsson (criminal), Swedish criminal
 Anton Axelsson (born 1986), Swedish ice hockey player
 Bjorn Axelsson (born 1942), Swedish organizational theorist
 Carina Axelsson, live-in companion to Gustav, Hereditary Prince of Sayn-Wittgenstein-Berleburg
 Christina Axelsson (born 1949), Swedish politician
 Dick Axelsson (born 1987), Swedish ice hockey player
 Emil Axelsson (ice hockey) (born 1986), Swedish ice hockey
 Emil Axelsson (co-driver) (born 1983), Swedish rally co-driver
 Erik Axelsson Tott (c. 1419–1481), regent of Sweden
 Jacob Axelsson Lindblom, Swedish scholar
 Kurt Axelsson (1941-1984), Swedish footballer
 Lennart Axelsson (born 1941), Swedish trumpet player
 Majgull Axelsson (born 1947), Swedish journalist and writer
 Niklas Axelsson (born 1972), Swedish cyclist
 Nils Axelsson, a Swedish footballer
 Olle Axelsson (1913-1980), Swedish bobsledder
 P. J. Axelsson (born 1975), Swedish ice hockey player
 Per Axelsson (born 1966), Swedish curler
 Peter Axelsson, Swedish badminton player 
 Ragnar Axelsson (born 1958), Swedish photographer
 Sun Axelsson (1935–2011), Swedish writer
 Thor Axelsson, Finnish sprint canoer
 Ulla Axelsson, Swedish actress also known as Ulla Akselson

See also 
 Axelsen
 Axelson

Swedish-language surnames